Kathleen "Kay" Margaret Midwinter became Kathleen Midwinter-Vergin (6 March 1909 – 6 August 1995) was a British secretary who became the first female clerk in the House of Commons and went on to be a United Nations official.

Life 
Midwinter was born in Wednesbury in 1909. 

She joined the League of Nations secretariat in 1930 when she was 21. She put this down to her ability with French, passing exams, gaining diplomas and her good looks.

In 1940 the League of Nations suspended its staff and Midwinter returned to the UK where she applied for work at the House of Commons at a time when they wanted to free male employees for military service. Her nine years experience at the League of Nations meant that she was the person who made newpaper stories as the first woman to be appointed a "temporary" clerk. She was first assigned to assist an existing clerk to a select committee but she had her own committee in April 1941. In 1942 she had a simple task which was to clerk for a small sub-committee that was looking at women's medical services. She was working for Irene Ward and Joan Davidson who sat on the national expenditure main committee. Midwinter impressed Ward and Davidson as she moved their report forward, calling in witnesses, handling correspondence and dealing with government departments. Ward and Davidson returned the favour by championing her pay which was well below her male peers, but they also used her. 

The foreign office was the last bastion of male traditions and Ward and Davidson arranged for Midwinter to join that department in 1942. She reported that she faced hostility in the economic relations department and she was rescued when Philip Noel-Baker became the minister. She helped to wind up the loose ends of the League of Nations. There were only fourteen women who were involved in preparing the way for the United Nations and Midwinter was one of them. Between 1946 and 1953 she was working at the U.N.

In 1969 she married a fellow civil servant (former Lieutenant-Colonel) Arthur Herbert Vergin OBE.

Midwinter died in Geneva in 1995. Her papers are in the Bodlian Library.

References 

1909 births
1995 deaths
People from Wednesbury
Civil servants